Colin Stripling (born October 27, 1994) is an American soccer player who plays as a midfielder for Stumptown AC of the National Independent Soccer Association.

Career
In early 2019 Stripling signed a contract with FC Tucson ahead of its first season in USL League One. He made his professional debut on March 30 as an 85th minute substitute in a 3–1 win over Orlando City B.

Following the end of the 2019 season Stripling was signed by fellow USL1 side Greenville Triumph SC on December 16 ahead of the 2020 season. He went on to make 11 appearances for the squad during the season. On December 10, 2020, the team announced it had declined a contract option on him.

On August 3, 2021, Stripling signed for Stumptown AC of the National Independent Soccer Association.

Career statistics

Club

Honors
Greenville Triumph SC
USL League One Champion: 2020

References

External links
 Profile at Monmouth University Athletics
 Profile at FC Tucson
 Profile at NISA
 

1994 births
Living people
American soccer players
Association football midfielders
FC Tucson players
Greenville Triumph SC players
Stumptown AC players
Monmouth Hawks men's soccer players
People from Scotch Plains, New Jersey
Seattle Sounders FC U-23 players
Soccer players from New Jersey
Sportspeople from Union County, New Jersey
USL League One players
USL League Two players
National Independent Soccer Association players